Lunghin may refer to:

Piz Lunghin, a peak in the Grisons, Switzerland
Lägh dal Lunghin, a nearby lake
Lunghin Pass, a mountain pass